Go Soeda won the title, after win against Ilija Bozoljac 3–6, 6–3, 6–2 in the final match.

Seeds

Draw

Finals

Top half

Bottom half

References
 Main draw
 Qualifying draw

2009 ATP Challenger Tour
2009 Singles